Minnesota State Highway 25 (MN 25) is a  highway in Minnesota, which runs from its interchange with U.S. Highway 169 in Belle Plaine and continues north to its intersection with State Highway 210 in Brainerd.

Route description
State Highway 25 serves as a north–south route in central Minnesota between Belle Plaine, Norwood Young America, Watertown, Buffalo, Monticello, Big Lake, Becker, Foley, and Brainerd.

The route travels east–west between Belle Plaine and Green Isle for 15 miles.

Highway 25 crosses the Minnesota River at Belle Plaine.

The route crosses the Highway 25 Bridge at the Mississippi River between Monticello and Big Lake.

History
State Highway 25 was authorized November 2, 1920 from Belle Plaine to Big Lake.

The roadway was fully graveled by 1928. It was paved in stages from north to south throughout the 1930s: from Big Lake to Buffalo in 1931, Buffalo to Montrose in 1932, Montrose to Watertown in 1933, and Watertown to Norwood in 1934.

Paving was completed in Belle Plaine in 1937, and the remaining gravel section through Sibley County was paved in 1950. 

When the four-lane bypass of U.S. 169 around Belle Plaine was built in 1955, Highway 25 was extended east along 169's former alignment to intersect the new highway.

In 1961, Highway 25 was extended north along what had previously been State Highway 218 from Becker to Merrifield. This highway was already paved in its entirety.

In 2001, the northernmost segment of the highway between State Highway 210 and Merrifield was turned back to Crow Wing County maintenance and is now designated County Road 3.

Major intersections

References

External links

Highway 25 at the Unofficial Minnesota Highways Page

025
Transportation in Scott County, Minnesota
Transportation in Sibley County, Minnesota
Transportation in Carver County, Minnesota
Transportation in Wright County, Minnesota
Transportation in Sherburne County, Minnesota
Transportation in Benton County, Minnesota
Transportation in Morrison County, Minnesota
Transportation in Crow Wing County, Minnesota